Turenne des Pres is a Haitian surname, also shortened to Des Pres. Notable people with the surname include:

François Turenne des Pres (1907–?), Haitian artist and writer
Josquin Des Pres ( 1450/1455–1521), French composer
Sebastien Des Pres (born 1998), American soccer player
Josquin Des Pres (20th century musician)

Surnames of Haitian origin